Crommelin may refer to:

People
 Andrew Claude de la Cherois Crommelin (1865–1939), British astronomer
 Bill Crommelin (1903–1998), Australian politician
 Charles Crommelin (1717–1788), British colonial administrator, Governor of Bombay
 Henriette Willemina Crommelin (1870-1957), Dutch labor leader and temperance reformer
 John G. Crommelin (1902–1996), U.S. Navy officer
 May Crommelin (1850–1930), British writer
 Minard Fannie Crommelin (1881–1972), Australian conservationist

Other uses
 27P/Crommelin, comet
 Crommelin (lunar crater), impact crater on the Moon
 Crommelin (Martian crater), impact crater on Mars
 USS Crommelin, U.S. Navy ship